I Started Out as a Child is Bill Cosby's second album, released in 1964. It is the first Cosby album that features his childhood memories in his comic routines, but many of the tracks are still observational humor.

The title of the album is the first words spoken by Cosby at the beginning of Side 1, as indicated in the liner notes on the back cover

Recorded live at Mister Kelly's in Chicago, Illinois, the album won the Grammy Award in 1965 for Best Comedy Album.  It was added to the National Recording Registry in 2009.

Track listing

Side one
Sneakers – 1:56
Street Football – 1:22
The Water Bottle – 0:51
Christmas Time – 1:44
The Giant – 2:29
Oops! – 0:58
The Lone Ranger – 3:07
Ralph Jameson – 1:53

Side two
Medic – 3:45
My Pet Rhinoceros – 0:46
Half Man – 0:47
Rigor Mortis – 2:47
The Neanderthal Man – 3:16
T.V. Football – 1:13
Seattle – 3:48

References

1964 live albums
Bill Cosby live albums
Stand-up comedy albums
Spoken word albums by American artists
Warner Records live albums
United States National Recording Registry recordings
Grammy Award for Best Comedy Album
1960s comedy albums
1960s spoken word albums
Albums produced by Allan Sherman
Albums recorded at Mister Kelly's
United States National Recording Registry albums